Eric Bergoust (born August 27, 1969) is an American freestyle skier. In 1998 Bergoust participated at the 1998 Winter Olympics held in Nagano, Japan where he won a gold medal in the freestyle ski jump (aerials).

Bergoust was born in Missoula, Montana. He has competed in aerials at four successive Winter Olympics. In addition to the gold medal in 1998, he finished 7th in 1994, 12th in 2002, and 17th in 2006.

He is one of five people known to have performed a quadruple flip on snow, along with Frank Bare, Jr., Lloyd Langlois, Matt Chojnacki and Nicolas Fontaine.

References

External links

Olympic gold medalists for the United States in freestyle skiing
Freestyle skiers at the 1994 Winter Olympics
Freestyle skiers at the 1998 Winter Olympics
Freestyle skiers at the 2002 Winter Olympics
Freestyle skiers at the 2006 Winter Olympics
Olympic freestyle skiers of the United States
American male freestyle skiers
1969 births
Living people
Medalists at the 1998 Winter Olympics
People from Missoula, Montana